The Nandi Award for Best Child Actress winners since 1977:

References

Child Actress
Awards for actresses